"Not Even Gonna Trip" is a song by British girl group Honeyz from the soundtrack Nutty Professor II: The Klumps. It was released in 2000 as their sixth single, and was the first with returning member Heavenli Abdi since "Love of a Lifetime". The Ed Case Remix of the song includes vocals from former member Mariama Goodman.

Track listing
UK Part I
"Not Even Gonna Trip" (radio edit)
"Finally Found" (Rude Boy Mix)
"Good Love" (radio edit)
 Enhanced CD includes "Not Even Gonna Trip" video

UK Part II
"Not Even Gonna Trip" (radio edit)
"Not Even Gonna Trip" (Ed Case Remix)
"Seems Like"
 Includes a limited edition poster

UK promo
"Not Even Gonna Trip" (radio edit)

Charts

References

2000 singles
Honeyz songs
2000 songs
Mercury Records singles